Mariusz Unierzyski (born March 5, 1974 in Płońsk) is a Polish footballer who played in the Ekstraklasa for Polonia Warsaw, KSZO Ostrowiec and Świt Nowy Dwór Mazowiecki.

Career

Club
In the summer 2009, he moved to Dolcan Ząbki from Vasas SC. He was released from Dolcan Ząbki on 27 June 2011.

References

External links
 

1974 births
Living people
Polish footballers
Polonia Warsaw players
KSZO Ostrowiec Świętokrzyski players
RKS Radomsko players
Vasas SC players
Ruch Chorzów players
Ilisiakos F.C. players
Ząbkovia Ząbki players
People from Płońsk
Gwardia Warsaw players
Sportspeople from Masovian Voivodeship
Association football defenders
Legionovia Legionowo players